"I Try to Think About Elvis" is a song written by Gary Burr, and recorded by American country music artist Patty Loveless. It was released in July 1994 as the first single from her album When Fallen Angels Fly.

American Aquarium covered the song on their 2021 album Slappers, Bangers, and Certified Twangers: Vol 1.

Background 
The song charted for 20 weeks on the Billboard Hot Country Singles and Tracks chart, reaching #3 during the week of October 22, 1994.

Music video
The music video was directed by John Lloyd Miller, and premiered in mid-1994. It features Loveless singing the song on various sets resembling the lyrics, such as a talk show. She is also seen on a wooden lift that takes her high into the air (which is actually a screen) as well as a man dressed in a tropical piece playing guitar (he is also seen with Loveless on the talk show). The song starts 20 seconds after the video begins, as it first shows Loveless in a bed scene forgetting her lines, when the director scolds her for doing so.

When played on CMT, the credit of the song is simply read "Think About Elvis" instead of "I Try to Think About Elvis".

Chart positions

Year-end charts

References

External links
 

1994 singles
1994 songs
Patty Loveless songs
Songs about Elvis Presley
Songs written by Gary Burr
Song recordings produced by Emory Gordy Jr.
Epic Records singles
Music videos directed by John Lloyd Miller